Paul H. Boeker (May 2, 1938 – March 29, 2003) was an American diplomat who served as the U.S. Ambassador to Jordan (1984–1987) and Bolivia (1977–1980).

Early life and education
Boeker was born in St. Louis, Missouri on May 2, 1938. He graduated Magna Cum Laude from Dartmouth College and received a master's degree in economics from the University of Michigan.

Career
Boeker was director of the Foreign Service Institute from 1980 to 1983.  While in Jordan, he arranged secret meetings between Jordanian and Israeli officials on issues such as telecommunications, counterterrorism and water sharing.  Because he protected American lives during a Bolivian military coup d'état in 1979, he received the State Department's Superior Honor Award. Boeker was president and chief executive of the Institute of the Americas at the University of California, San Diego, a networking organization between Western Hemisphere countries in multiple economic sectors. for the last 14 years of his career.

Personal life and death
Boeker died from brain cancer at his home in San Diego, California, on March 29, 2003, at the age of 64.

References

1938 births
2003 deaths
People from St. Louis
20th-century American diplomats
Ambassadors of the United States to Jordan
Ambassadors of the United States to Bolivia
Dartmouth College alumni
University of Michigan alumni
People from San Diego
Deaths from brain cancer in the United States
American nonprofit chief executives
American academic administrators
20th-century American academics